The 6th South Carolina Cavalry Regiment (also called Dixie Rangers, Aiken's Partisan Rangers and 1st Partisan Rangers) was a regiment of cavalry in the Confederate States Army during the American Civil War. They were from the state of South Carolina and served at various times in both the Eastern and Western theaters.

Organization and history
This unit was originally called the 16th Battalion South Carolina Partisan Rangers - Aiken's Regiment, the 1st Reg. South Carolina Partisan Rangers, and Aiken's 1st Regiment South Carolina Partisan Rangers. It was a part of the state militia troops. The men were formally mustered into Confederate service as the 16th Battalion, South Carolina Cavalry on July 23, 1862. The 6th South Carolina Cavalry was then organized in January 1863, using the 16th Battalion as its nucleus.

Some of the men were from Columbia, including several students from The Citadel Academy. The 6th Cavalry saw action at Willstown and Pon Pon River in South Carolina, and then moved to Virginia with about 1,000 men and was assigned to the Cavalry Corps of the Army of Northern Virginia. Assigned to General Matthew C. Butler's brigade, the regiment participated in the Wilderness and Cold Harbor operations and in various conflicts south of the James River. Later, it was engaged in the Carolinas Campaign assigned to Logan's Brigade.

The depleted regiment surrendered with the Army of Tennessee at Bennett Place in North Carolina.

Notable battles
Battle of the Wilderness VA (May 5–6, 1864)
Battle of Spotsylvania Court House VA (May 8–21, 1864)
Battle of North Anna VA (May 23–26, 1864)
Cold Harbor VA (June 1–3, 1864)
Siege of Petersburg, Virginia (June 1864 - April 1865)
Battle of Vaughan Road (October 1, 1864)
Carolinas Campaign SC (February - April 1865)
Darlington, South Carolina (February 27, 1865)
Solomon's Grove (March 9, 1865)
Battle of Monroe's Crossroads (March 10, 1865)

Original commissioned officers
Colonel Hugh K. Aiken
Lieutenant Colonel Lovick P. Miller
Major T.B. Ferguson
Captain Lewis Jones
Captain James J. Gregg
First Lieutenant Z. W. Carwile
First Lieutenant John M. Ward
First Lieutenant Alexander McQueen, from Chesterfield County
Second Lieutenant John Bauskett
Second Lieutenant J. J. Bunch
Second Lieutenant Henry McIver
Second Lieutenant Samuel W. Evans

Noncommissioned officers
 George W. Spencer, 1Sgt from Chesterfield County. Departed Greensboro, North Carolina, after April 9, 1865 - Promoted 1st Lt. June 25, 1863
 John B. Strother, 2Sgt from Chesterfield County. Discharged, over conscript age, June 11, 1862
 Hugh Jr. Craig, 3Sgt from Chesterfield County. Departed Greensboro, NC after April 9, 1865 - Promoted 2Lt, June 25, 1863
 John H. McIver, 4Sgt from Chesterfield County. Transferred to staff as Quartermaster, May 1, 1862
 John E. Sellers, 5Sgt from Chesterfield County. Promoted to 1Sgt, June 25, 1863. Killed in action at Haw's Shop, Virginia
 Thomas W. Bouchler, 1Cpl from Chesterfield County. Transferred to Colt's Battalion as SgtMaj in 1864
 Zacharhiah Jr Ellerbe, Cpl from Chesterfield County. Discharged, over conscript age, June 14, 1862
 Samuel H. Roberson, 3Cpl from Chesterfield County. Transferred to Aiken's Partisan Rangers, December 15, 1862
 Nevin S. Smith, 4Cpl from Chesterfield County. Departed Greensboro, North Carolina, after April 9, 1865
 William B. Sellers, Corporal, Chesterfield County. Enlisted June 1, 1863; captured on December 10, 1864, at Armstrong Mills, Virginia, and sent as a prisoner of war to Point Lookout, Maryland; released on June 19, 1865.  Walked home to South Carolina

See also
List of South Carolina Confederate Civil War units

References
Baker, Gary R. Cadets in Gray. Palmetto Bookworks, 1989. .
Crute, Joseph H., Jr. Units of the Confederate States Army. Midlothian, Virginia: Derwent Books, 1987. See p. 254 (1 photocopied page) for a concise summary of the regiment's service.
Confederate Military History, Extended Edition. Vol. 6: South Carolina. Wilmington, NC: Broadfoot, 1987. Contains numerous, scattered references to South Carolina units. A history of the war discussing South Carolina troops and their participation.
Sifakis, Stewart. Compendium of the Confederate Armies: South Carolina.... New York: Facts on File, 1995. (Unit organizational history).

Further reading
The following manuscript may be found in the U.S. Army Military History Institute's archives:
Sheppard, James O. - CWMiscColl (SGM's letters, March 11, 1863 - May 7, 1864)

Units and formations of the Confederate States Army from South Carolina
1862 establishments in South Carolina
Military units and formations established in 1862